Grigoriy Aleksandrovich Andreyev (born 7 January 1976) is a Russian marathon runner. He competed at the 2004, the 2008 and 2012 Olympics and finished 19th, 14th and 37th, respectively.

Andreyev coaches his wife, Iuliia Andreeva, who is a Kyrgyzstani Olympic marathon runner. They have one daughter.

Achievements

References

External links 

marathoninfo

1976 births
Living people
Russian male long-distance runners
Russian male marathon runners
Athletes (track and field) at the 2004 Summer Olympics
Athletes (track and field) at the 2008 Summer Olympics
Athletes (track and field) at the 2012 Summer Olympics
Olympic athletes of Russia
Sportspeople from Bashkortostan